MV Azov Concord is a Turkish-owned general cargo ship which was the first foreign ship to depart the port of Mariupol since the start of the 2022 Russian invasion of Ukraine.

Description 

History 
In February 2022, Azov Concord was in port in Mariupol when the 2022 Russian invasion of Ukraine broke out. The escalation in hostilities trapped the ship in the port city, along with five other foreign-flagged merchant ships, for months. During this time, the ship sustained damages as a result of the siege of Mariupol which were eventually repaired.

By May, talks between Russia and Turkey were underway to establish a maritime corridor in the Black Sea in order to allow Turkish merchant ships, including Azov Concord, to export essential goods including grain from Russian-occupied Ukraine. During this time, the port of Mariupol fell and was occupied by Russian forces. On 22 June, Russian media and Turkey's defense ministry announced that the Azov Concord was the first foreign ship to leave the port of Mariupol since the invasion began. The vessel made for the port of Novorossiysk in southern Russia, where it anchored later that day. However, the vessel did not appear to be carrying a cargo of grain or other raw resources when it left Mariupol.

References 

Cargo ships of Turkey
2008 ships